Nameless Men is a 1928 American silent drama film directed by Christy Cabanne and starring Claire Windsor, Antonio Moreno and Eddie Gribbon.

Cast
 Claire Windsor as Mary  
 Antonio Moreno as Robert Strong  
 Eddie Gribbon as Blackie  
 Ray Hallor as Hughie  
 Charles Clary as Mac  
 Carolynne Snowden as Maid  
 Sally Rand
 Stepin Fetchit

References

Bibliography
 Monaco, James. The Encyclopedia of Film. Perigee Books, 1991.

External links

1928 films
1928 drama films
Silent American drama films
Films directed by Christy Cabanne
American silent feature films
1920s English-language films
Tiffany Pictures films
American black-and-white films
1920s American films